The  Åfjorden (or sometimes just Åfjord) is a fjord in Trøndelag county, Norway. The municipal center of Åfjord, Årnes, lies at the head of the fjord. The Åfjorden flows into the Lauvøyfjorden between the village of Lysøysundet and the island of Lauvøya, and then it flows out into the ocean.

References

Åfjord
Fjords of Trøndelag